Jaques Bisan (born 15 September 1993) is a professional footballer who plays as a striker for the Egyptian club Ittihad Alexandria and the Benin national team

In July 2015, he signed a five-year contract to join the Ittihad.

References

External links
 

1993 births
Living people
Beninese footballers
Beninese expatriate footballers
Association football forwards
Benin international footballers